Marani Editore is an Italian art book publisher based in Rome. It has published exhibition catalogues of artists such as Joseph Beuys, Fabio Mauri, Vettor Pisani, Marcel Duchamp, Emilio Vedova, Andy Warhol, Dino Buzzati, and Mark Rothko, as well as books by highly regarded contemporary art critics like Achille Bonito Oliva, Filiberto Menna and Emilio Villa.

Notable publications
 Filiberto Menna, Ufficio per l'immaginazione preventiva (1976) 
 Achille Bonito Oliva, Life of Marcel Duchamp (1976)
 Filiberto Menna, Fabio Mauri: Language is War (1975)
 Achille Bonito Oliva, Vettor Pisani: Lo scorrevole (1975)

External links
Marani Editore

Book publishing companies of Italy
Visual arts publishing companies
Companies based in Rome